Heino Vihtori Pulli (March 22, 1938 – April 11, 2015) was a Finnish professional ice hockey player who played in the SM-liiga.  Born in Sortavala, Finland, he played for TK-V who later became KOOVEE.  He was inducted into the Finnish Hockey Hall of Fame in 1994.

References

External links
 
 Finnish Hockey Hall of Fame bio

1938 births
2015 deaths
Finnish ice hockey centres
KOOVEE players
Ice hockey players at the 1960 Winter Olympics
Ice hockey players at the 1964 Winter Olympics
Olympic ice hockey players of Finland
People from Sortavala